Thug Notes is an American educational web series that summarizes and analyzes various literary works in a comedic manner. Thug Notes first aired on June 3, 2013, on YouTube, with the pilot episode centered on Crime and Punishment. The host of the series is Sparky Sweets, Ph.D., portrayed by actor and comedian Greg Edwards. In 2015, a book of essays based on episodes from the series entitled Thug Notes: A Street-Smart Guide to Classic Literature was published by Vintage Books.

Style
The series is presented by Sparky Sweets, Ph.D., in the character's "original gangster" style.

The following is an example of Sweets' style from his analysis of To Kill a Mockingbird, one of his most popular: "Only a jive-ass fool would bother capping a mockingbird, cause all them bitches do is just drop next-level beats for your enjoyment. So what my girl Harper trying to say is ratting on Boo Radley wouldn't do no good. It would only rid the hood of one more true-blue player."

Explaining the usage of African-American Vernacular English within the series, Edwards stated, "but the truth is, the gift of literature is universal in meaning and should be made accessible to everyone on every plane. So, 'Thug Notes' is my way of trivializing academia's attempt at making literature exclusionary by showing that even high-brow academic concepts can be communicated in a clear and open fashion." The style used by Edwards' character was a result of "frustration with the world of academia".

Episodes

Reception
Thug Notes has been met with a cumulative view total of over 160 million (as of June 2017) and critical acclaim. Thug Notes'''s virality has been documented by mainstream news publications such as The New York Times and HuffPost. The Tampa Bay Times has noted that the series can be used as an educational tool. However, The New York Times somewhat criticized the increase in the frequency of style of the series, stating "We have to put a stop to inappropriate hip-hop appropriation before we get the Fox News 'Rap the Headlines Hour' or 'Gangsta 60 Minutes'."

In 2014, Wisecrack/Thug Notes was listed on NewMediaRockstars'' Top 100 Channels, ranked at #94.

References

2013 web series debuts
Online edutainment
Reading and literacy television series
YouTube original programming
American non-fiction web series